Palau, officially the Republic of Palau and historically Belau, Palaos or Pelew, is an island country and microstate in the western Pacific. The nation has approximately 340 islands and connects the western chain of the Caroline Islands with parts of the Federated States of Micronesia. The most populous island is Koror, home to the country's most populous city of the same name. The capital Ngerulmud is located on the nearby island of Babeldaob, in Melekeok State. Palau shares maritime boundaries with international waters to the north, the Federated States of Micronesia to the east, Indonesia to the south, and the Philippines to the northwest.

The country was originally settled approximately 3,000 years ago by migrants from Maritime Southeast Asia. Palau was first drawn on a European map by the German missionary Paul Klein based on a description given by a group of Palauans shipwrecked on the Philippine coast on Samar.  Palau islands were made part of the Spanish East Indies in 1885. Following Spain's defeat in the Spanish–American War in 1898, the islands were sold to Germany in 1899 under the terms of the German–Spanish Treaty, where they were administered as part of German New Guinea. After World War I, the islands were made a part of the Japanese-ruled South Seas Mandate by the League of Nations. During World War II, skirmishes, including the major Battle of Peleliu, were fought between American and Japanese troops as part of the Mariana and Palau Islands campaign. Along with other Pacific Islands, Palau was made a part of the United States-governed Trust Territory of the Pacific Islands in 1947. Having voted in a referendum against joining the Federated States of Micronesia in 1978, the islands gained full sovereignty in 1994 under a Compact of Free Association with the United States.

Politically, Palau is a presidential republic in free association with the United States, which provides defense, funding, and access to social services. Legislative power is concentrated in the bicameral Palau National Congress. Palau's economy is based mainly on tourism, subsistence agriculture and fishing, with a significant portion of gross national product (GNP) derived from foreign aid. The country uses the United States dollar as its official currency. The islands' culture mixes Micronesian, Melanesian, Asian, and Western elements. Ethnic Palauans, the majority of the population, are of mixed Micronesian, Melanesian, and Austronesian descent. A smaller proportion of the population is of Japanese descent. The country's two official languages are Palauan (a member of the Austronesian language family) and English, with Japanese, Sonsorolese, and Tobian recognized as regional languages.

Etymology
The name for the islands in the Palauan language, Belau, derives from the Palauan word for "village", beluu (thus ultimately from Proto-Austronesian *banua), or from aibebelau ("indirect replies"), relating to a creation myth. The name "Palau" originated in the Spanish Los Palaos, eventually entering English via the German Palau. An archaic name for the islands in English was the "Pelew Islands". Palau is unrelated to Pulau, which is a Malay word meaning "island" found in a number of place names in the region.

History

Early history 

Palau was originally settled between the 3rd and 2nd millennia BCE, most likely from the Philippines or Indonesia.

After the 16th century 
The next recording of the existence of Palau by Europeans came a century later in 1697 when a group of Palauans was shipwrecked on the Philippine island of Samar to the northwest. They were interviewed by the Czech missionary Paul Klein on 28 December 1696. Klein was able to draw the first known European map of Palau based on the Palauans' representation of their home islands that they made with an arrangement of 87 pebbles on the beach. Klein reported his findings to the Jesuit Superior General in a letter sent in June 1697.

Spanish era 

This map and the letter caused a vast interest in the new islands. Another letter written by Fr. Andrés Serrano was sent to Europe in 1705, essentially copying the information given by Klein. The letters resulted in three unsuccessful Jesuit attempts to travel to Palau from Spanish Philippines in 1700, 1708, and 1709. The islands were first visited by the Jesuit expedition led by Francisco Padilla on 30 November 1710. The expedition ended with the stranding of the two priests, Jacques Du Beron and Joseph Cortyl, on the coast of Sonsorol, because the mother ship Santísima Trinidad was driven to Mindanao by a storm. Another ship was sent from Guam in 1711 to save them only to capsize, causing the death of three more Jesuit priests. The failure of these missions gave Palau the original Spanish name Islas Encantadas (Enchanted Islands).

Transitions era 

British traders became regular visitors to Palau in the 18th century (the British East India Company packet ship Antelope shipwrecked off Ulong Island in 1783, leading to Prince Lee Boo's visit to London), followed by expanding Spanish influence in the 19th century. Palau, under the name Palaos, was included in the Malolos Congress in 1898, the first revolutionary congress in the Philippines, which wanted full independence from colonialists. Palau, at the time, was part of the Spanish East Indies headquartered in the Philippines. Palau had one appointed member to the Congress, becoming the only group of islands in the entire Caroline Islands granted high representation in a non-colonial Philippine Congress. Congress also supported the right of Palau to self-determination if ever it wished to pursue such a path. Later in 1899 as part of the Caroline Islands, Palau was sold by the Spanish Empire to the German Empire as part of German New Guinea in the German–Spanish Treaty (1899). During World War I, the Japanese Empire annexed the islands after seizing them from Germany in 1914. Following World War I, the League of Nations formally placed the islands under Japanese administration as part of the South Seas Mandate. In World War II, Palau was used by Japan to support its 1941 invasion of the Philippines, which succeeded in 1942. The invasion overthrew the American-installed Commonwealth government in the Philippines and installed the Japanese-backed Second Philippine Republic in 1943.

United States era 
During World War II, the United States captured Palau from Japan in 1944 after the costly Battle of Peleliu, when more than 2,000 Americans and 10,000 Japanese were killed and later the Battle of Angaur. In 1945–1946, the United States re-established control of the Philippines and managed Palau through the Philippine capital of Manila. By the latter half of 1946, however, the Philippines was granted full independence with the formation of the Third Republic of the Philippines, shifting the U.S. Far West Pacific capital to Guam. Palau was passed formally to the United States under United Nations auspices in 1947 as part of the Trust Territory of the Pacific Islands established pursuant to Security Council Resolution 21.

Independence 

Four of the Trust Territory districts joined together and formed the Federated States of Micronesia in 1979, but the districts of Palau and the Marshall Islands voted against the proposed constitution. Palau, the westernmost cluster of the Carolines, instead opted for independent status in 1978, which was widely supported by the Philippines, Taiwan, and Japan. It approved a new constitution and became the Republic of Palau on 1 January 1981. It signed a Compact of Free Association with the United States in 1982. In the same year, Palau became one of the founding members of the Nauru Agreement. After eight referendums and an amendment to the Palauan constitution, the Compact was ratified in 1993. The Compact went into effect on 1 October 1994, making Palau de jure independent, although it had been de facto independent since 25 May 1994, when the trusteeship ended. Formal diplomatic relations with the Philippines were re-established in the same year, although the two nations already had diplomatic back channels prior to 1994. Palau also became a member of the Pacific Islands Forum, but withdrew in February 2021 after a dispute regarding Henry Puna's election as the Forum's secretary-general.

Legislation making Palau an "offshore" financial center was passed by the U.S. Senate in 1998.

In 2001, Palau passed its first bank regulation and anti-money laundering laws.

In 2005, Palau led the Micronesia challenge, which would conserve 30% of near-shore coastal waters and 20% of forest land of participating countries by 2020. In 2009, Palau created the world's first shark sanctuary, banning commercial shark fishing within its waters. In 2012, the Rock Islands of Palau was declared as a UNESCO World Heritage Site.

In 2015, Palau became a member of the Climate Vulnerable Forum under the chairmanship of the Philippines, and at the same time, the country officially protected 80% of its water resources, becoming the first country to do so. The protection of its water resources made significant increases in the country's economy in less than two years. In 2017, the nation became the first to establish an eco-promise, known as the Palau Pledge, which are stamped on local and foreign passports. In 2018, Palau and the Philippines began re-connecting their economic and diplomatic relations. The Philippines supported Palau to become an observer state in ASEAN, as Palau also has Southeast Asian ethnic origins.

In November 2020, Surangel Whipps Jr was elected as the new President of Palau to succeed President Tommy Remengesau.

Politics and government

Palau is a democratic republic. The President of Palau is both head of state and head of government. Executive power is exercised by the government, while legislative power is vested in both the government and the Palau National Congress. The judiciary is independent of the executive and the legislature. Palau adopted a constitution in 1981.

The governments of the United States and Palau concluded a Compact of Free Association in 1986, similar to compacts that the United States had entered into with the Federated States of Micronesia and the Republic of the Marshall Islands. The compact entered into force on 1 October 1994, concluding Palau's transition from trusteeship to independence as the last portion of the Trust Territory of the Pacific Islands to secure its independence pursuant to Security Council Resolution 956.

The Compact of Free Association between the United States and Palau sets forth the free and voluntary association of their governments. It primarily focuses on the issues of government, economic, security, and defense relations. Palau has no independent military, relying on the United States for its defense. Under the compact, the American military was granted access to the islands for 50 years. The U.S. Navy role is minimal, limited to a handful of Navy Seabees (construction engineers). The U.S. Coast Guard patrols in national waters.

Foreign relations

As a sovereign nation, Palau conducts its own foreign relations. Since independence, Palau has established diplomatic relations with a number of nations, including many of its Pacific neighbors, like Micronesia and the Philippines. On 29 November 1994, the United Nations Security Council passed Resolution 963 recommending Palau's admission to the United Nations. The United Nations General Assembly approved admission for Palau pursuant to Resolution 49/63 on 15 December 1994. Palau has since joined several other international organizations. In September 2006, Palau hosted the first Taiwan-Pacific Allies Summit. Its President has made official visits to other Pacific countries, including Japan.

The United States maintains a diplomatic delegation and an embassy in Palau, but most aspects of the countries' relationship have to do with Compact-funded projects, which are the responsibility of the U.S. Department of the Interior's Office of Insular Affairs. For example, as part of this Compact, Palau was granted ZIP Codes 96939 and 96940, along with regular U.S. Mail delivery.

In international politics, Palau often votes with the United States on United Nations General Assembly resolutions.

Palau has maintained close ties with Japan, which has funded infrastructure projects, including the Koror–Babeldaob Bridge. In 2015, Emperor Akihito and Empress Michiko visited Peleliu to honor the 70th anniversary of World War II.

Palau is a member of the Nauru Agreement for the Management of Fisheries.

In 1981, Palau voted for the world's first nuclear-free constitution. This ban delayed Palau's transition to independence because while negotiating the Compact, the U.S. insisted on the option to operate  nuclear-propelled vessels and store nuclear weapons within the territory, prompting campaigns for independence and denuclearization. After several referendums that failed to achieve a  majority, the people of Palau finally approved the Compact in 1994.

The Philippines, a neighboring ally of Palau to the west has expressed its intent to back Palau if ever it wishes to join ASEAN.

In June 2009, Palau announced that it would accept up to seventeen Uyghurs who had previously been detained by the American military at Guantanamo Bay, with some American compensation for the cost of their upkeep.

Only one of the Uyghurs initially agreed to resettlement, but by the end of October, six of the seventeen had been transferred to Palau. An aid agreement with the United States, finalized in January 2010, was reported to be unrelated to the Uyghur agreement.

In 2017, Palau signed the United Nations Treaty on the Prohibition of Nuclear Weapons.

The government has agreed to host a large United States Air Force high-frequency radar station in Palau, a Tactical Multi-Mission Over the Horizon Radar (TACMOR) system costing well over $100 million, which is expected to be operational in 2026.

Administrative divisions

Palau is divided into sixteen states (until 1984 called municipalities). These are listed below with their areas (in square kilometres) and 2012 estimated and 2015 Census populations:

Historically, Palau's Rock Islands have been part of the State of Koror. The Southwestern islands (Sonsorol and Hatohobei States) do not speak Palauan, but the distantly related Sonsorolese-Tobian (related to Woleaian of Woleai atoll, Yap State)

Maritime law enforcement

Palau's Division of Marine Law Enforcement patrols the nation's  exclusive economic zone. They operate two long-range patrol boats, the Kedam and the Remeliik II, to hunt for poachers and unlicensed fishermen. Smaller boats are used for littoral operations. They are based on Koror.

Political future 
Palau may now be seen, particularly in the Indo-Pacific region, as a key example of the successes of modern state-building.  It has successfully transitioned peacefully from colonial rule to full admission to the United Nations. Palau has maintained strong foreign relations with its neighbors in its region of Oceania, maintaining membership in the Pacific Island Forum. There have also been pushes for Palau to have observer status to the ASEAN as a demonstration of its growing influence in the region.  However, Palau's peaceful transition to fully autonomous sovereign nation is not without debate. Palau is hugely reliant on international aid, as demonstrated by President Surangel Whipps Jr address to the UN General Assembly in 2021. American influence has also led some to contest that there are challenges to its sovereignty with its reliance on the American military under the Compact of Free Association, although not officially designated a de facto protectorate or otherwise. American influence has also resulted in huge changes to Palau's society with vast changes to the economy and political processes and as such Palau may not yet be seen as a fully independent state or a fully realised success of modern state-building.

International shipping 
Although Palau's ship registry represents less than 0.001% of the world fleet of commercial ships, it contains almost 60% of last-voyage flags in 2019. It suggests that the registry is used by shipping companies to evade end-of-life responsibilities. These responsibilities entail the decommissioning of a ship in such a way that the environmental impact and labor conditions are in order.

Geography

Palau's territory consists of an archipelago located in the Pacific Ocean. Its most populous islands are Angaur, Babeldaob, Koror and Peleliu. The latter three lie together within the same barrier reef, while Angaur is an oceanic island several kilometers to the south. About two-thirds of the population lives on Koror.

The coral atoll of Kayangel is north of these islands, while the uninhabited Rock Islands (about 200) are west of the main island group.

Climate
Rainfall is heavy throughout the year, averaging . The average humidity is 82% and, although rain falls more frequently between June and October, there is still much sunshine.

Palau lies on the edge of the typhoon belt. Tropical disturbances frequently develop near Palau every year, but significant tropical cyclones are quite rare. Mike, Bopha and Haiyan are the only systems that struck Palau as typhoons on record.

Environment

Palau has a history of strong environmental conservation. For example, Ngerukewid islands and the surrounding area are protected under the Ngerukewid Islands Wildlife Preserve, which was established in 1956.

While much of Palau remains free of environmental degradation, areas of concern include illegal dynamite fishing, inadequate solid waste disposal facilities in Koror, and extensive sand and coral dredging in the Palau lagoon. As with other Pacific island nations, rising sea level presents a major environmental threat. However, according to the Emissions Database for Global Atmospheric Research average carbon dioxide emissions per person were 60 tonnes in 2019, the highest in the world, and mostly from transport.  Inundation of low-lying areas threatens coastal vegetation, agriculture, and an already insufficient water supply. Wastewater treatment is a problem, along with the handling of toxic waste from fertilizers and biocides.

One species of saltwater crocodile, Crocodylus porosus, is also indigenous to Palau, occurring in varying numbers throughout the mangroves and in parts of the Rock Islands. Although this species is generally considered extremely dangerous, there has only been one fatal human attack, on 28 December 1965, in Palau in modern history. This attack led to a crocodile eradication program and trade in crocodile hides that ran into the 1980s. A management and conservation program running since the 1990s has led to a stabilization of the Palauan crocodile population.<ref>{{cite book|last1=Webb|first1=Grahame J.W.|last2=Manolis|first2=S. Charlie|last3=Brien|first3=Matthew L.|date=2010|chapter=Saltwater Crocodile Crocodylus porosus|pages=99–113|title=Crocodiles. Status Survey and Conservation Action Plan|edition=third|editor1-first=S.C.|editor1-last=Manolis|editor2-first=C.|editor2-last=Stevenson|publisher=Crocodile Specialist Group|location=Darwin, Northern Territory, Australia|chapter-url=https://www.iucncsg.org/365_docs/attachments/protarea/18%20--8088e67a.pdf}}</ref> In Palau, the largest crocodile measured .

The nation is also vulnerable to earthquakes, volcanic activity, and tropical storms. Palau already has a problem with inadequate water supply and limited agricultural areas to support its population.

On 5 November 2005, President Tommy E. Remengesau, Jr. took the lead on a regional environmental initiative called the Micronesia challenge, which would conserve 30% of near-shore coastal waters and 20% of forest land by 2020. Following Palau, the initiative was joined by the Federated States of Micronesia, the Marshall Islands, and the US territories of Guam and Northern Mariana Islands. Together, this combined region represents nearly 5% of the marine area of the Pacific Ocean and 7% of its coastline.

Palau contains the Palau tropical moist forests terrestrial ecoregion. It had a 2019 Forest Landscape Integrity Index mean score of 8.09/10, ranking it 27th globally out of 172 countries.

Sanctuary
On 25 September 2009, Palau announced that it would create the world's first shark sanctuary. Palau banned all commercial shark fishing within the waters of its exclusive economic zone (EEZ). President Johnson Toribiong announced the sanctuary at a meeting of the United Nations. President Toribiong proposed a worldwide ban on fishing for sharks. In 2012, Palau received the Future Policy Award from World Future Council, because "Palau is a global leader in protecting marine ecosystems".

Economy

Palau's economy consists primarily of tourism, subsistence agriculture, and fishing. Tourist activity focuses on scuba diving and snorkeling in the islands' rich marine environment, including its barrier reefs' walls and World War II wrecks. In April 2022, Palau launched Ol'au Palau, a responsible tourism program aimed to preserve the country's natural environment and traditional culture. The government is the largest employer, relying heavily on US financial assistance. Business and tourist arrivals numbered some 50,000 in fiscal year 2000–2001.

The population enjoys a per capita income twice that of Micronesia as a whole. Long-term prospects for the key tourist sector have been greatly bolstered by the expansion of air travel in the Pacific, the rising prosperity of leading East Asian countries and the willingness of foreigners to finance infrastructure development.

Air service has at times been spotty. Palau Micronesia Air, Asian Spirit and Pacific Flier provided service to the Philippines and other destinations at various times during the 2000s, but all suspended service. United Airlines now provides near-daily service to and from Guam, and once-weekly service to Yap. Also, Korean Air provides service three times per week to Incheon.

Palau is served by an 80-bed hospital, Belau National Hospital. With some medical specialties, there is no such specialty care in Palau necessitating medical care in Taiwan, the Philippines, or Hawaii. There are no dermatologists or ophthalmologists (eye specialists) in Palau. VEGF drugs for diabetic eye diseases cannot be given for eye conditions so laser surgery is done by visiting American ophthalmologists. Belau National Hospital cannot treat certain brain hemorrhages necessitating emergency airlift to Taiwan.

In November 2006, Pacific Saving Bank officially announced bankruptcy. On 13 December 2006, the Palau Horizon reported that 641 depositors had been affected. Among them, 398 held less than US$5,000, with the remainder ranging from US$5,000 to US$2 million. On 12 December 79 affected people received compensation. Mr. Toribiong said, "The fund for the payout came from the balance of the Palau government's loan from Taiwan." From a total of US$1 million, which originally was for assisting Palau's development, US$955,000 was left at the time of bankruptcy. Toribiong requested the Taiwanese government use the balance to repay its loans. Taiwan agreed to the request. The compensation would include those who held less than US$4,000 in an account.

The income tax has three brackets with progressive rates of 9.3 percent, 15 percent, and 19.6 percent respectively. Corporate tax is four percent, and the Palau Goods and Services Tax (or PGST) was introduced on January 1, 2023. It is a broad-based tax of 10%, applied to most goods and services and other items sold or consumed in Palau. There are no property taxes.

Major tourist draws in Palau include Rock Islands Southern Lagoon, a UNESCO World Heritage Site, and four tentative UNESCO sites, namely, Ouballang ra Ngebedech (Ngebedech Terraces), Imeong Conservation Area, Yapease Quarry Sites, and Tet el Bad (Stone Coffin).

Transportation

Palau International Airport provides scheduled direct flights with Guam, Manila, and Taipei. Palau Pacific Airways also has charter flights to and from Hong Kong and Macau. In addition, the states of Angaur and Peleliu have regular service to domestic destinations.

Freight, military, and cruise ships often call at Malakal Harbor, on Malakal Island outside Koror. Taxis are available in Koror. They are not metered and fares are negotiable. Transportation between islands mostly relies on private boats and domestic air services. However, there are some state-run boats between islands as a cheaper alternative.

Demographics

There are many Asian communities within Palau. Filipinos form the largest Asian group and second largest ethnic group in the country, dating back to the Spanish colonial period. There are significant numbers of Chinese and Koreans. There are also smaller numbers of Palauans of mixed or full Japanese ancestry. Smaller numbers of Bangladeshi and Nepalese migrant workers and their descendants who came to the islands during the late 1900s can also be found. Most Palauans of Asian origin came during the late 1900s with many Chinese, Bangladeshis, and Nepalese coming to Palau as unskilled workers and professionals. There are also small numbers of Europeans and Americans.

Languages
The official languages of Palau are Palauan and English, except in two states (Sonsorol and Hatohobei) where the local languages, Sonsorolese and Tobian, respectively, along with Palauan, are official. Japanese is spoken by some older Palauans and is an official language in the State of Angaur. Including second-language speakers, more people speak English than Palauan in Palau. Additionally, a significant portion of the population speak Filipino and Bengali.

Religion

According to 2015 estimates 45.3% of the population is Roman Catholic (due to its shared colonial heritage with the Philippines), 6.9% Seventh-day Adventist, 34.9% other Protestant (due to American administration), 5.7% Modekngei and 3.0% Muslim (due to its shared Islamic heritage with southern Philippines). In 2009, the small Jewish community sent two cyclists to the 18th Maccabiah Games.

The German and Japanese occupations of Palau both subsidized missionaries to follow the Spanish. Germans sent Roman Catholics and Protestants, the Japanese sent Shinto and Buddhist, and the Spaniards sent Roman Catholic missionaries as they controlled Palau. Three-quarters of the population are Christians (mainly Roman Catholics and Protestants), while Modekngei (a combination of Christianity, traditional Palauan religion and fortune telling) and the ancient Palauan religion are commonly observed. Japanese rule brought Mahayana Buddhism and Shinto to Palau, which was the majority religion among Japanese settlers. However, following Japan's World War II defeat, the remaining Japanese largely converted to Christianity, while the remainder continued to observe Buddhism, but stopped practicing Shinto rites. There are also approximately 400 Bengali Muslims in Palau, and recently a few Uyghurs detained in Guantanamo Bay were allowed to settle in the island nation.

Culture

Palauan society follows a very strict matrilineal system. Matrilineal practices are seen in nearly every aspect of Palauan traditions, especially in funerals, marriages, inheritance, and the passing of traditional titles. The system probably had its origins in the Philippine archipelago, which had a similar system until the archipelago was colonized by Spain.Evidence?

The cuisine includes local foods such as cassava, taro, yam, potato, fish and pork. Western cuisine is favored among young Palauans and the locals are joined by foreign tourists. The rest of Micronesia is similar with much less tourism, leading to fewer restaurants.  Tourists eat mainly at their hotels on such islands. Some local foods include an alcoholic drink made from a coconut on the tree; a drink made from the roots of the kava; and the chewing of betel nuts.

The traditional government system still influences the nation's affairs, leading the federal government to repeatedly attempt to limit its power. Many of these attempts took the form of amendments to the constitution that were supported by the corporate sector to protect what they deemed should be free economic zones.  One such example occurred in early 2010, when the Idid clan, the ruling clan of the Southern Federation, under the leadership of Bilung, the Southern Federation's queen, raised a civil suit against the Koror State Public Lands Authority (KSPLA). The Idid clan laid claim over Malakal Island, a major economic zone and Palau's most important port, citing documents from the German Era. The verdict held that the island belonged to the KSPLA.

Traditional government

The present-day "traditional" government of Palau is a continuation of its predecessors. Traditionally, Palau was hierarchically organized. The lowest level is the village or hamlet, then the chiefdom (now politically referred to as a state), and finally alliances of chiefdoms. In ancient times, numerous federations divided power, but upon the 17th-century introduction of firearms by the British, an imbalance of power occurred.

Palau became divided into northern and southern federations. The Northern Federation is headed by the high chief and chiefess of the ruling clan Uudes of Melekeok state, the Reklai, and Ebilreklai. They are commonly referred to as the king and queen of the Northern Federation. This northern federation comprises the states of Kayangel, Ngerchelong, Ngardmau, Ngiwal, Ngaraard, Ngatpang, Ngeremlengui, Melekok, Aimeliik, Ngchesar, and Airai. The Southern Federation is likewise represented by the high chief and chiefess of the ruling Idid of Koror state.

The Southern Federation comprises the states of Koror, Peleliu, and Angaur. However, fewer and fewer Palauans have knowledge of the concept of federations, and the term is slowly dying out. Federations were established as a way of safeguarding states and hamlets that shared economic, social, and political interests, but with the advent of federal government, safeguards are less meaningful. However, in international relations, the king of Palau is synonymous with the Ibedul of Koror. This is because Koror is the industrial capital of the nation, elevating his position over the Reklai of Melekeok.

It is a misconception that the king and queen of Palau, or any chief and his female counterpart for that matter, are married. Traditional leaders and their female counterparts have always been related and unmarried (marrying relatives was a traditional taboo). Usually, a chief and his female counterpart are brother and sister, or close cousins, and have their own spouses.

 Newspapers 
Palau has several newspapers:

 Rengel Belau (1983–1985)
 Tia Belau (1992–present)
 Island TimesSports

Baseball is a popular sport in Palau after its introduction by the Japanese in the 1920s. The Palau national baseball team won the gold medal at the 1990, 1998 and 2010 Micronesian Games, as well as at the 2007 Pacific Games.

Palau also has a national football team, organized by the Palau Football Association, but is not a member of FIFA. The Association also organizes the Palau Soccer League.

On 20 June 2022, left fielder Bligh Madris played his first game for the Pittsburgh Pirates against the Chicago Cubs, thus becoming the first player ever to play in MLB from Palau. He went 3-for-4 with two RBI in his debut.

Education
Primary education is required until the age of 16. Schools include both public and private institutions as well as some fields of study available at Palau Community College. For further undergraduate, graduate, and professional programs, students travel abroad to attend tertiary institutions, primarily in the United States of America. Other popular choices among Palauan scholars include San Diego State University, the University of Guam, the University of Hawaiʻi at Hilo, the University of the Philippines, Mindanao State University, and the University of the South Pacific.

Cuisine

Palau has its own cuisine, for instance, a dessert called tama. Palauan cuisine includes local foods such as cassava, taro, yam, potato, fish and pork. It is also heavily influenced by Japanese, American as well as the Philippines' cuisine, due to the significant presence of Filipino migrant workers. Fruit bat soup is a commonly referenced Palauan delicacy.

See also

 Index of Palau-related articles
 Outline of Palau

References

Notes

External links

 Government 
 Republic of Palau National Government
 Embassy of the Republic of Palau in Japan
 Chief of State and Cabinet Members
 Honorary Consulate of the Republic of Palau to the United Kingdom of Great Britain and Northern Ireland
 Honorary Consulate-General of Palau to Belgium

 Local News 
 Island Times Palau Wave Radio
 Pacific Note

 General information 
 Palau. The World Factbook. Central Intelligence Agency.
 Palau from the University of Colorado at Boulder Libraries (USA) – Government Publications
 
 Palau profile from the BBC News
 "Palau"—Encyclopædia Britannica'' entry
 
 NOAA's National Weather Service – Palau
 The Interesting History of Prince Lee Boo, Brought to England from the Pelew Islands—From the Collections at the Library of Congress

 
1994 establishments in Oceania
Archipelagoes of the Pacific Ocean
Associated states of the United States

Countries in Micronesia
Countries in Oceania
English-speaking countries and territories
Former colonies in Oceania
Former German colonies
Former Japanese colonies
Former Spanish colonies
German New Guinea
Island countries
Islands of Oceania
Members of the Unrepresented Nations and Peoples Organization
Member states of the United Nations
Republics
Small Island Developing States
South Seas Mandate
Spanish East Indies
States and territories established in 1994
Trust Territory of the Pacific Islands